Charles Egon IV, Prince of Fürstenberg (Charles Egon Maria Frédéric Emile Kaspar Henri Guillaume Kamill Max Louis Victor; 25 August 1852 – 27 November 1896) was a German military officer and nobleman who was the head of the House of Fürstenberg from 1892 to 1896.

Early life
He was born in Krušovice, the son of Charles Egon III of Fürstenberg and his wife Elisabeth, youngest daughter of Heinrich XIX, Prince Reuss of Greiz.

He was taught by private tutors and traveled in his youth, as well as assisting at philosophical and legal conferences at Heidelberg University from 1872 to 1874. He then continued to study at Strasbourg University.

Career
After his studies at Strasbourg University, he entered the Prussian Army as a lieutenant in a hussar regiment at Potsdam, rising to major, then colonel.

He accompanied the Prince of Hatzfeld-Trachenberg in March 1888 on the latter's trip to Rome to meet Pope Leo XIII. Following his father's death in 1892, he became Prince of Fürstenberg. A member of the Prussian House of Lords, the Württemberg House of Lords and the upper house in Baden, he was elected to the Reichstag on 10 November 1893.

Personal life
On 6 July 1881, he married countess Dorothée "Dolly" de Talleyrand-Périgord (1862–1948), a daughter of duke Napoléon-Louis de Talleyrand-Périgord (son of duke Edmond de Talleyrand-Périgord and princess Dorothée de Courlande) and his wife, Pauline de Castellane (daughter of marshal Boniface de Castellane and his wife, Louise-Cordélia Greffulhe).

The prince died at the chateau de Bruttan near Nice on 27 November 1896.  His widow, Dorothée, remarried to Jean de Castallane.

Sources 

1852 births
1896 deaths
People from Rakovník District
People from the Kingdom of Bohemia
Charles Egon IV
German princes
German Bohemian people
German Roman Catholics
German landowners
Members of the 9th Reichstag of the German Empire
Members of the Prussian House of Lords
Members of the First Chamber of the Diet of the Grand Duchy of Baden
Members of the Württembergian Chamber of Lords